Barbara Nesvadbová, born Barbara Nesvadbová (January 14, 1975, Prague), is a Czech writer and journalist.

Biography
Barbara was born in Prague into a family of doctors, both psychiatrists. Mother Libuše Nesvadbová is involved with assisting immigrants and ethnic minorities. Father Josef Nesvadba († 2005) was known as an author of sci-fi literature.
Barbara’s ex-husband is the politician Karel Březina with whom she has a daughter Bibiana Nesvadbová. Bára has a degree in journalism and mass communication from the Faculty of Social Sciences, Charles University, in Prague. 
She started working as editor-in-chief of Xantypa and later Playboy. Currently, she is editor-in-chief of the Czech edition of the prestigious fashion magazine Harper's Bazaar.

Literary career 
While at university, Barbara had already started working with publisher Romana Přidalová. Until then, she had written short essays and sketches which were later all linked through one character, and became short stories. This resulted in her first book, Řízkaři (“Schnitzellers”), which deals with sex, relationships and a young journalist named Karla who is trying to find her way.  Bára’s second book, Bestiář (“Bestiary”), officially proclaimed one of the most-borrowed library books, became the basis for the eponymous movie where the main characters were played by Danica Jurčová, Karel Roden and Marek Vašut. The movie was directed by the famous Czech director Irena Pavlásková. Barbara Nesvadbová co-wrote the script. Her next books followed fast: Život nanečisto (“Life as a Draft”); Pohádkář (“Storyteller”) which became a movie in 2014 with Jiří Macháček and Eva Herzigová playing the main characters; a collection of short sketches Brusinky (“Cranberries”); and a short story collection, Borůvky (“Blueberries). In between, Barbara wrote a cheerful children’s book dedicated to her daughter Bibiana called “Garpíškoviny aneb Bibi a čtyři kočky” (“A Very Merry Dog’s Life or Bibi and Four Cats”). In 2013, Barbara Nesvadbová published the book Přítelkyně (“Female Friends”), two novellas about women’s friendship. In 2014, she published another collection of sketches called Pralinky (“Pralines”).

Charity Projects 
The writer is regularly involved in many and various charitable projects; she actively supports the non-profit organization Etincelle, where she is a member on the board of directors. She also actively supports Habitat “Zahrada v Kladně” for mentally handicapped clients. Further, Barbara supports Unicef, the organization Dobrý Anděl and Helppes. In addition, Barbara is a founder of the Bazaar Charity endowment which financially supports the rehabilitation of handicapped people.

Books
Řízkaři (2006, Motto, Albatros) .
Bestiář (2007, Motto, Albatros)
Život na nečisto (2008, Motto, Albatros)
Brusinky (2011, Brána; 2015, Motto, Albatros)
Pohádkář (2011, Motto, Albatros)
Garpíškoviny - aneb Bibi a čtyři kočky (2011, Brána; 2015, Motto, Albatros)
Borůvky (2012, Brána)
Tři maminky a tatínek (2012, co-authored with Alena Ježková and Natálie Kocábová; Brio)
Přítelkyně (2013, Motto, Albatros)
Pralinky (2014, Motto, Albatros)

Bibliography - Audiobooks
Bestiář (2008, Popron Music & Publishing; narrated by Jitka Čvančarová )
Pohádkář (2011,2014, Motto, Albatros; narrated by Táňa Vilhelmová)
Brusinky (2011, Motto, Albatros; narrated by Ivana Jirešová and Markéta Hrubešová)
Pralinky (2015, Motto, Albatros; narrated by Barbara Nesvadbová)
Garpíškoviny - aneb Bibi a čtyři kočky (2015, Motto, Albatros; narrated by Martin Dejdar)

Screenplays
Bestiář (2007; directed by Irena Pavlásková)
Pohádkář (2014; directed by Vladimír Michálek)

References

General references
  (English- Student Underground, reviewed 2019-02-02)
  (English- Sociál, reviewed 2019-02-02)

External links
 

1975 births
Living people
Czech columnists
Writers from Prague
Czech women writers
Czech women columnists
Czech journalists
Czech women journalists
Charles University alumni